Janus Hellemons (20 July 1912 – 14 January 1999) was a Dutch racing cyclist. He finished in last place in the 1938 Tour de France.

References

External links
 

1912 births
1999 deaths
Dutch male cyclists
People from Halderberge
Cyclists from North Brabant
20th-century Dutch people